Macrium Reflect is a backup utility for Microsoft Windows developed by Paramount Software UK Ltd in 2006. It creates disk images and file backup archives using Microsoft Volume Shadow Copy Service to ensure 'point in time' data accuracy. Macrium Reflect can back up whole partitions or individual files and folders into a single compressed, mountable archive file, which can be used to restore exact images of the partitions on the same hard disk for disaster recovery, or a new hard disk for data migration.

It has received numerous favorable reviews, and is often recommended and used as an example program for cloning and backup tutorials.

Overview 
Macrium Reflect can create full, incremental and differential backup images, or selectively back up individual files and folders. Data is compressed and encrypted in real time using LZ-based compression and AES encryption algorithms. Images can be mounted as a drive letter in Windows Explorer and restored using a custom Macrium Reflect Rescue CD. In the event of a partial or complete system loss, this image can be used to restore the entire disk, one or more partitions, or individual files and folders.

Macrium Reflect can clone one disk onto another, and restore an image to new hardware. Using pre-created Macrium Reflect Rescue media (CD, DVD or USB memory stick), critical drivers required by the new system can be inserted into the image taken from the old system, making it compatible with the new hardware.

Macrium Reflect image backups created with any older version (Free or paid editions) can be restored with any later version.

Macrium Site Manager 
A central management console is available which enables scheduling, restore and monitoring of multiple networked computers running Macrium Reflect using a Web browser user interface.

Free edition 
An unsupported free edition is available for home and commercial use.  It lacks some features of the full versions, such as incremental backup (though it includes differential backup), but still has some features found only in expensive commercial products. The free edition is being retired and will receive security patches until 1st January 2024. 

Note 2024-01-01: Free edition retired. Macrium Reflect v8.0 is the last version to receive feature, compatibility or bug fix updates. Service anouncement: "This is to notify that Macrium Reflect Free Edition is being retired. Security patches will be provided until 1st January 2024, but there are no planned feature changes or non security related updates following this update. No further updates will be provided after that date. Macrium Reflect Free v8.0.7167 was the last release to receive bug fixes, compatibility updates and features. Users of the free version may continue to use it, but they are on their own when they run into issues. (...)"

Releases 

 2021-05-17 Macrium Reflect 8.0 released (build 8.0.5903)
 2020-10-14 Macrium Reflect 7.3 released (build 7.3.5281)
 2017-09-29 Macrium Reflect 7.2 released (build 7.2.3811)
 2017-09-28 Macrium Reflect 7.1 released (build 7.1.2602)
 2017-02-27 Macrium Reflect 7.0 released (build 7.0.1994)
 2015-02-16 Macrium Reflect 6.0 released
 2011-06-01 Macrium Reflect 5.0 released

See Macrium Product Support Policy for Support Status of Macrium Reflect.

References 

Disk image emulators
Microsoft software
Freeware
Disk cloning
Backup software